La Colmena is Spanish for "the hive" or "the beehive". "La Colmena" may refer to:

La Colmena, Paraguay, a city in Paraguay
La colmena (film), a 1982 Spanish-language film
La colmena, a computer game released in 1992 by the Spanish company Opera Soft
The Hive (Cela novel), a 1951 Spanish-language novel by Camilo José Cela, entitled La Colmena in Spanish
La Colmena, a nickname for Nicolás de Piérola Avenue in Lima
La Colmena, another name for the Tacna-Colmena Building in Lima

See also
Beehive (disambiguation)
Hive (disambiguation)